= Archives of Pharmacal Research =

- Discipline: Pharmacology
- Language: English
- Edited by: Seok-Yong Lee

Publication details
- History: 1976-present
- Publisher: Springer Science+Business Media
- Frequency: Monthly
- Impact factor: 4.946 (2020)

Standard abbreviations
- ISO 4: Arch. Pharmacal Res.

Indexing
- CODEN: APHRDQ
- ISSN: 0253-6269 (print); 1976-3786 (web)
- OCLC no.: 740952968

Links
- Journal homepage; Online archive

Archives of Pharmacal Research is a bimonthly, peer-reviewed medical journal covering research on pharmacology. It was established in 1976 and is published by Springer Science+Business Media on behalf of the Pharmaceutical Society of Korea, of which it is the official journal. The editor-in-chief is Seok-Yong Lee (Sungkyunkwan University). According to the Journal Citation Reports, the journal has a 2020 impact factor of 4.946.
